East Cottingwith is a village and former civil parish, now in the parish of Cottingwith, East Riding of Yorkshire, England. In 1931 the civil parish had a population of 185. On 1 April 1935 the civil parish was merged with Storwood to create Cottingwith.

The civil parish of Cottingwith is formed by the village of East Cottingwith and the hamlet of Storwood.
According to the 2011 UK Census, Cottingwith parish had a population of 349, an increase on the 2001 UK Census figure of 290.

The village church is St Mary's and is a Grade II listed building.

Gallery

References

External links

Villages in the East Riding of Yorkshire
Former civil parishes in the East Riding of Yorkshire